Amaranth Borsuk (born 1981) is an American poet and educator known for her experiments with textual materiality and digital poetry. She is currently an associate professor at the University of Washington Bothell's School of Interdisciplinary Arts & Sciences, where she teaches undergraduate courses on poetry, philology, and experimental writing alongside co-chairing the school's M.F.A. program in Creative Writing since 2018.

Life 
Borsuk was born in Meriden, Connecticut. She is fluent in English, French and Hebrew. 

Borsuk holds a B.A. in English from the University of California Los Angeles, and an M.A. in English Literature and Ph.D. in Literature and Creative Writing from the University of Southern California. 

Borsuk was a Mellon Postdoctoral Fellow in the Humanities at MIT. She has been married to software developer Brad Bouse since 2013, and the couple have one daughter.

Works 
Her work includes poetry (Handiwork, Tonal Saw, Pomegranate Eater), artist books, and collaborative digital projects (Abra, As We Know, Whispering Galleries, Between Page and Screen), and she has a special interest in investigating textual materiality.

Publications 

Between Page and Screen (Siglio, 2012) by Borsuk and Brad Bouse is a 2012 project that incorporated both a paper book and digital art. The paper book did not contain words but had a series of geometric patterns. Readers used a webcam to have the text appear above the book. 
 Between Page and Screen was reviewed by Books on Books.

Whispering Galleries (2014) by Borsuk and Brad Bouse is a 2014 site-specific, interactive, multimedia poetry project that uses a reader's gestures to transform a local diary into erasure poetry on the screen. As readers gesture over the computer, transcriptions from a diary dissolve as so much digital dust, leaving behind a poem. Through a webcam, the participant's shadow emerges behind the words, creating a symbolic link between the viewer and the work.

Whispering Galleries was commissioned by Site Projects, a nonprofit that supports artistic works. The project was also supported by The New Haven Free Public Library and the Arts Council of Greater New Haven. Originally displayed at the New Haven Free Public Library on April 26, 2014, it later went on to be exhibited at The Institute Library in New Haven (2014), The International Symposium on Electronic Art at Simon Fraser University, Vancouver (2015), and “You | I: Interfaces & Reader Experience” at the Paul Watkins Gallery, Winona State University (2016). It is available online. For the full experience, a Chrome browser, a Leap controller, and a webcam are required.

ABRA (2016) by Borsuk, Kate Durbin, and Ian Hatcher was created under a National Endowments for the Arts funded Expanded Artists’ Books Grant from the Center for Book and Paper Arts at Columbia College Chicago. It was reviewed in Weird Sisters.

Prizes 
 Gulf Coast Poetry Prize, 2011 
 Slope Editions Prize, 2011

 Subito Prize, 2014

See also

List of electronic literature authors, critics, and works
Digital poetry
E-book#History
Electronic literature
Hypertext fiction
Interactive fiction
Literatronica

References

External links
 Whispering Galleries entry on ELD.
 Whispering Galleries entry on ELMCIP.
 Whispering Galleries entry on Scalar.

Living people
American poets
University of Washington faculty
University of California, Los Angeles alumni
University of Southern California alumni
University of Washington Bothell faculty
1981 births
Electronic literature writers